La Bellière may refer to the following places in France:

 La Bellière, Orne, a commune in the Orne department
 La Bellière, Seine-Maritime, a commune in the Seine-Maritime department